Guadalinex is an Ubuntu-based operating system promoted by the government of Andalusia (Spain). It is used in schools, public libraries, centers for elderly people and Guadalinfo centers.

There are five different versions of Guadalinex:
 Guadalinex EDU (specially developed for schools by the CGA), includes Gnome Nanny
 Guadalinex CDM (for centers of elderly people)
 Guadalinex Guadalinfo (only used in Guadalinfo centers, where any person living in Andalusian rural areas can access the Internet for free)
 Guadalinex Bibliotecas (special version for public libraries)
 Guadalinex Mini (minimalistic Guadalinex distribution, suitable for old computers, and netbooks)

See also
 CGA (Advanced Management Centre)

References

External links

Debian-based distributions
Spanish-language Linux distributions
Educational operating systems
State-sponsored Linux distributions